Manufacturing Consent: The Political Economy of the Mass Media is a 1988 book by Edward S. Herman and Noam Chomsky.

Manufacturing Consent may also refer to:

 The "manufacture of consent", a phrase coined by Walter Lippmann in his 1922 book Public Opinion
 Manufacturing Consent (Burawoy book), a 1979 book by Michael Burawoy
 Manufacturing Consent: Noam Chomsky and the Media, a 1992 documentary film based on the book by Herman and Chomsky

See also 

 Cultural engineering
 Mass media
 Noble lie
 Propaganda
 Social dynamics
 Social engineering (disambiguation)
 "The Engineering of Consent", a 1947 essay by Edward Bernays